Stage of Youth (pinyin: Qing Chun Wu Tai) is a 12-episode Chinese drama that first aired on January 26, 2009 on CCTV2 as a tribute to the 2008 Summer Olympics. It is also the first lead role for Super Junior member Han Geng, who was an official torch bearer.

Storyline
Xia Lei (Han Geng) is a young man who loves to dance. His father is a top archery athlete and since Xia Lei's mother died, had missed the opportunity to compete in the last Olympics. His father wants him to follow in his footsteps. Yet, Xia Lei only has a passion for dancing. After going through conflicts with his father, meeting constant tribulation and challenges, and gaining determination, he finally reached his dreams and becomes a new generation of dancing star.

Cast
Han Geng - Xia Lei (夏磊)
Huang Yi - Tian Mo Mo (田默默)
Joey Yung - Shen Z - Rainie Yang
Yumiko Cheng - Shen Su Cai (申素彩)
Kenny Kwan - A-Bo
Johnny Zhang - Ding Xiao
Kim Ryeowook - Xiu Lo
Other Super Junior-M members - (cameo)

External links
 Stage of Youth Homepage

2009 Chinese television series debuts
Chinese sports television series
Chinese drama television series
China Central Television original programming
Mandarin-language television shows